Alter Teichweg is an underground rapid transit station located in the Hamburg district of Dulsberg, Germany. The station was opened in 1963 and is served by Hamburg U-Bahn line U1.

Station layout

The station has two 120 meters (394 ft.) long side platforms. The only exit of the station is at the northern end of the station, located in the intersection between Alter Teichweg and Nordschleswiger Straße. There is an emergency exit at the southern end.

Service

Trains  
Alter Teichweg is served by Hamburg U-Bahn line U1. Departures are every 5 minutes from Monday through Friday with additional trains during the peak-hours. On weekends, departures are every 10 minutes. The travel time to Hamburg Hauptbahnhof takes about 13 minutes.

Connections 

Bus lines 23 (from Niendorf Markt to Billstedt, every 5 minutes) and 39 (from Wandsbek Markt to Teufelsbrück; every 20 minutes) stop above the station.

See also 

 List of Hamburg U-Bahn stations

References

External links 

 Line and route network plans at hvv.de 

Hamburg U-Bahn stations in Hamburg
U1 (Hamburg U-Bahn) stations
Buildings and structures in Hamburg-Nord
Railway stations in Germany opened in 1963
1963 establishments in West Germany